Project Narwhal is the name of a computer program used by the 2012 campaign by Barack Obama. It was contrasted in the Mitt Romney presidential campaign by Project Orca, so named because the orca is one of the few predators of the narwhal.

Development 
Project Narwhal was developed for six-to-seven days a week and 14 hours a day by a staff of very-experienced workers of companies such as Twitter, Google, Facebook, Craigslist, Quora, Orbitz, and Threadless. The intent of the program was to link previously separate repositories of information, enabling all the data gathered about each individual voter was available to all arms of the campaign. In testing Narwhal, the team, in campaign CTO Harper Reed's words, role-played "every possible disaster situation," including three role-plays where all the systems would go down very quickly on election day. These "game day" practices would prepare them for actual disasters when Amazon Web Services went down on October 21, 2012, and Hurricane Sandy threatened the technology infrastructure in the Eastern United States.

See also

 Cambridge Analytica
 Catalist
 Contingency table
 Data dredging
 Dan Wagner (data scientist)
 The Groundwork
 Harper Reed
 Herd behavior
 Left-wing politics
 Michael Slaby
 ORCA (computer system)
 Psychographic
 Predictive Analytics
 Project Houdini

References

Barack Obama
2012 United States presidential campaigns
Political campaign techniques
Political campaign technology
Mobile software
Software projects
2012 software
Analytics